The Sudeten ringlet (Erebia sudetica) is a species of butterfly in the family Nymphalidae. It is found in Czech Republic, Poland, Romania, France, and Switzerland. Its natural habitat is temperate grassland. It is threatened by habitat loss.

Biology
The larvae feed on various grasses. Of these, Anthoxanthum odoratum is probably the most important foodplant, but other grasses, such as Poa annua, are also used. There is one generation per year. The species passes the winter in the larval stage.

References

Sources

Erebia
Butterflies of Europe
Butterflies described in 1861
Taxonomy articles created by Polbot
Taxa named by Otto Staudinger